Mulready is a surname. Notable people with the surname include:

Augustus Edwin Mulready (1844–1904), British painter
David Mulready (born 1947), Australian Anglican bishop
Glen Mulready (born 1960), American politician
Sally Mulready, Irish public official
William Mulready (1786–1863), Irish painter